"The King Is Half-Undressed" is a song by the American power pop group Jellyfish. It is the first single released in support of their 1990 debut album Bellybutton.

Formats and track listing 
All songs written by Roger Manning and Andy Sturmer.
European 7" single (CUSS 1)
"The King Is Half-Undressed" – 3:48
"Calling Sarah" – 4:03

European CD single (CUSCD1)
"The King Is Half-Undressed" – 3:48
"Calling Sarah" – 4:03
"The Man I Used to Be" – 4:34

Charts

References

External links 
 

1990 songs
1990 singles
Jellyfish (band) songs
Charisma Records singles
Song recordings produced by Jack Joseph Puig
Song recordings produced by Albhy Galuten
Songs written by Andy Sturmer
Songs written by Roger Joseph Manning Jr.
Music videos directed by Nick Brandt